Stirtoniella is a lichen genus in the family Ramalinaceae. It is a monotypic genus, containing the single species Stirtoniella kelica, a crustose and corticolous lichen originally described from New Zealand in 1873 as a species of Lecidea. The photobiont is an alga of the family Chlorococcaceae. The genus is named after Scottish mycologist James Stirton.

References

Ramalinaceae
Monotypic Lecanorales genera
Taxa described in 2005
Taxa named by Josef Hafellner
Taxa named by David Galloway (botanist)
Taxa named by John Alan Elix
Lichen genera